An incubus is a male demon that has sexual intercourse with sleeping women.

Incubus may also refer to:

Film 
 Incubus (1966 film), a film in Esperanto starring William Shatner
 Incubus (2006 film), a horror film starring Tara Reid
 The Incubus (1982 film), a horror film starring John Cassavetes
 François Sagat's Incubus, a 2011/2012 gay pornographic film, and directorial debut for François Sagat

Music 
 Incubus (band), an American alternative rock band from California
 Opprobrium (band), American death metal band from Louisiana originally known as Incubus
 "Incubus", a song by British neo-progressive rock band Marillion from 1984's Fugazi (album)

Other 
 The Incubus, a nickname given to radio executive John Hayes by Howard Stern when the two were together at WNBC

See also 
 Succubus (disambiguation)